The sixth cycle of America's Next Top Model premiered on March 8, 2006, which would be the last cycle to air on UPN before merging with The WB to create The CW. The catchphrase for this cycle was "Fairy Tales Come True." This cycle was filmed from October through November 2005.

The prizes for this cycle were:

 A modeling contract with Ford Models.
 A fashion spread and cover in Elle magazine.
 A 100,000 contract with CoverGirl cosmetics.

The international destination during this cycle was Bangkok and Phuket, Thailand. The show’s first visit to South East Asia.

The winner was 20-year-old Danielle Evans from Little Rock, Arkansas with Joanie Dodds placing as the runner-up.

Contestants
(Ages stated are at start of contest)

Episodes

Summaries

Call-out order

 The contestant was eliminated
 The contestant won the competition

Bottom two

 The contestant was eliminated after their first time in the bottom two
 The contestant was eliminated after their second time in the bottom two
 The contestant was eliminated after their third time in the bottom two
 The contestant was eliminated after their fifth time in the bottom two
 The contestant was eliminated in the final judging and placed as the runner-up

Average  call-out order
Casting call-out order and final two are not included.

Photo shoot guide
Episode 2 photo shoot: Bald covered in Swarovski crystals
Episode 3 photo shoot: Ice princesses in a magazine
Episode 4 photo shoot: Falling fairy tale princesses
Episode 5 photo shoot: Future Careers with male models
Episode 6 Commercial: CoverGirl Clean Liquid Foundation at a pool party
Episode 7 photo shoot: Krumping
Episode 8 photo shoots: Dolls; emotional black & white beauty shots
Episode 9 photo shoot: Mermaids hanging in the Floating Market
Episode 11 photo shoot: Posing on an elephant for Venus razors
Episode 12 photo shoot: Ocean Pacific swimwear on the beaches of Phuket
Episode 13 photo shoot & commercial: CoverGirl lash exact mascara commercial and print ad

Makeovers
 Wendy - Honey blonde highlights
 Kari - Brigitte Bardot inspired big curls with bangs
 Gina - Cut to shoulder length and angles added
 Mollie Sue - Mia Farrow inspired pixie cut
 Leslie - Long wavy dark brown extensions
 Brooke - Gisele Bundchen inspired blonde highlights
 Nnenna - Buzzed
 Furonda - Tiffany Richardson inspired long straight black weave  
 Sara - Brigitte Nielsen inspired cut and dyed platinum blonde
 Jade - Cut short and dyed golden blonde with matching eyebrows
 Joanie - Dyed ice blonde; later, snaggletooth removed and porcelain crowns added
 Danielle - Extra-long wavy weave; later, front tooth gap adjusted

Post–Top Model careers

Nnenna Agba has signed with OmodelAfrica, and Bookings Model Agency. She has been on the cover of True Love, Clam, Onyx Style, and Time Out London magazines. She has appeared in Essence, Jewel and Arise magazine and has modeled for Red and Lulu. She also appeared in a commercial for McDonald's. She can be seen in the music video "Girlfriend" by Sergey Lazarev.
Sara Albert had some test shoots with Elite Models Management and appeared in the cover and a spread in Engaged! Magazine. She has since left the industry, and is now married, took the name of her husband and now goes by Sara Hallmark and lives in Washington, D.C. She is currently working at Hogan Lovells as a law firm associate.
Furonda Brasfield has a contract with VMH Models in Vancouver that she received through the model scouting firm ModelScouts.com. She had her own show, Model Me TV. She has also appeared in a few ads and numerous runway shows. She also appeared in one episode of Cycle 10. After quiting modeling she worked as a real estate agent, and is now a licensed attorney in Arkansas.
Gina Choe has taken a few test shots, is currently in school and lives in Florida. She has signed with Ford Models Miami under the Lifestyle division.
Jade Cole has opened up a production company, the Biracial Butterfly Productions. She has also been featured in several ads for Nelly's Apple Bottoms Clothing Line. She was signed to Diva Models, Singapore; Dream Models, Hong Kong; Uber-Warning Models, Los Angeles; VMH Models, Vancouver; and SMG Models, Seattle by the model scouting firm ModelScouts.com and to Elite Model Management in Hong Kong in 2009. She has appeared in the music videos "Go On Girl" by Ne-Yo and "Digital Girl" by Jamie Foxx ft. Kanye West, The-Dream, and Drake. Cole was asked to be a contestant on America's Next Top Model: All-Stars, but declined due to contract agreement.
Joanie Dodds has been featured in several magazines. She appeared in one episode of Cycle 8 posing for a photograph with contestant Renee Alway and she later appeared in Cycle 10. She was also a guest judge on the Vietnamese Modeling Project, its format is related to ANTM. She has been signed to Elite Model Management in New York, Über-Warning Models and Elite Model Management in Hong Kong.  Also a licensed contractor, Joanie was co-host of DIY Network's Run My Renovation for four seasons. In 2018, she joined the cast of Trading Spaces as a carpenter under her married name of Sprague.
Danielle Evans has collected all of her prizes and appeared in campaigns with Sephora, Tory Burch, and Akademiks. She was signed with Ford Models and has had her Covergirl contract renewed multiple times. She is currently signed with Click Model Management. She was featured on Project Runway and the series' Top Model in Action during Cycles 11 and 13.
Kathy Hoxit is looking for agencies in New York.
Leslie Mancia is signed to Ford Models in Los Angeles, Muse Management in New York City, and The Arizona Agency. She used to be signed with Elite Model Management in Los Angeles and Miami, Nous Model Management, Major Model Management, and Percent Model Management. She recently walked for Anya Ayoung Chee in the Project Runway season 9 finale. She also modeled for Michael Costello in Project Runway: All Stars.
Kari Schmidt has returned to school, but plans to model when she is done with school.
Brooke Staricha has been with various agencies and is signed with I Model and Talent in New York.
Mollie Sue Steenis-Gondi is signed to several modeling agencies, including Elite in New York and Barcelona, Storm Model Management, and Why Not Model Agency. She has been featured in Vogue, has modeled for Levi's, Vision, Winners F06, Florida International, Out, D La Repubblica Delle Donne, Mixte, Tush, ANNA, Madame Figaro, eLuxury.com, Zink, Madame, Cosmopolitan, CopCopines, Fashion, Self, Diesel, The Lake & Stars F/W 07, Adorn W 07, Grazia, Vanidad, Avant-Garde, Sang Bleu, Gondi Ishiko, Soon, Rene Furterer International Magazine, Style Mag, Intersection, and appeared in Top Model in Action in Cycle 11.
Wendy Wiltz is represented by I.D. Model Management.

Trivia

 J. Alexander revealed that he actually didn't want Furonda in the house but Jay Manuel and Tyra did, which is why she made it into the house.
 On the Tyra Banks show Tyra revealed to Kathy she was "outvoted" the night Kathy was eliminated from the show.

Notes

References

External links
 

A06
2006 American television seasons
Television shows filmed in California
Television shows filmed in Thailand